Jimmie Augustsson (born 13 April 1981 in Tyringe, Hässleholm) is a Swedish footballer.

External links

Living people
1981 births
Swedish footballers
Kalmar FF players
Assyriska FF players
Trelleborgs FF players
Allsvenskan players
Superettan players
Association football midfielders